Casey Snider is an American politician serving as a member of the Utah House of Representatives from the 5th district. Elected in 2018, he assumed office on January 2, 2019.

Early life and education 
Snider was raised in Liberty, Utah. He earned a Bachelor of Science degree in conservation and restoration ecology, law, and constitutional studies from Utah State University and a Master of Science in environmental science and policy from Johns Hopkins University.

Career 
After earning his master's degree, Snider worked in the field of environmental and natural resources policy, commuting between Utah and Washington, D.C. He worked as a legislative director for Rob Bishop and was a staffer on the United States House Committee on Natural Resources. He is the executive director of the Bear River Land Conservancy. Snider has also worked as a rancher and volunteer firefighter in Cache County, Utah. Snider was elected to the Utah House of Representatives in 2018. When he assumed office on January 2, 2019, he became one of the youngest members of the House.

Personal life 
Snider and his wife, Kelli, have one daughter. They live in Avon, Utah.

References 

Living people
Year of birth missing (living people)
Utah State University alumni
Johns Hopkins University alumni
People from Cache County, Utah
Republican Party members of the Utah House of Representatives